The Conteo de Población y Vivienda (Count of Population and Housing) is a national census compiled by the government of Mexico, taken intermedially between the more comprehensive national general censuses (Censo General de Población y Vivienda). Like the general census, the Conteo is conducted on a decennial basis—every ten years in a year ending in 5, while the censo general is conducted in years ending in 0. The first conteo was conducted in 1995, and the second in 2005, intermediate between the last censo general in 2000 and the next scheduled census in 2010.

The responsibility for designing and carrying out the conteo and the general census lies with the national statistics body, INEGI (Instituto Nacional de Estadística, Geografía e Informática).

External links
 Memoria del Conteo de Población y Vivienda 1995, online publication of the I Conteo de Población y Vivienda 1995, INEGI 
 II Conteo de Población y Vivienda 2005, results of the 2005 conteo

National Institute of Statistics and Geography
Censuses in Mexico